Francesco Maria Moles, C.R. (1638 – 12 May 1697) was a Roman Catholic prelate who served as Bishop of Nola (1684–1695).

Biography
Francesco Maria Moles was born in Naples, Italy in 1638 and ordained a priest in the Congregation of Clerics Regular of the Divine Providence in 1653. On 10 January 1684, he was appointed during the papacy of Pope Innocent XI as Bishop of Nola. On 16 January 1684, he was consecrated bishop by Alessandro Crescenzi (cardinal), Cardinal-Priest of Santa Prisca, with Giuseppe Bologna, Archbishop Emeritus of Benevento, and Victor Augustinus Ripa, Bishop of Vercelli, serving as co-consecrators. He served as Bishop of Nola until his resignation in 1695. He died on 12 May 1697.

While bishop, he was the principal co-consecrator of Placido Scoppa, Archbishop of Dubrovnik (1693).

References

External links and additional sources
 (for Chronology of Bishops) 
 (for Chronology of Bishops) 

17th-century Italian Roman Catholic bishops
Bishops appointed by Pope Innocent XI
1638 births
1697 deaths
Clerics regular
Theatine bishops
Clergy from Naples